SearchMe was a visual search engine based in Mountain View, California. It organized search results as snapshots of web pages — an interface similar to that of the iPhone's and iTunes's album selection.

In July 2009, the company lost funding and the search engine went offline.

History

Founding
SearchMe was founded in March 2005 by Randy Adams and John Holland. Adams was inspired to start this search engine when his 5-year-old son was having difficulty reading. He hoped to create a search engine that "would improve the experience of finding information online". Sequoia Capital spent millions of dollars to fund SearchMe during the website's opening years.

In March 2008, the site was launched in beta status. In April 2008, the company launched its search engine on the Internet.

Offline in July 2009
The company had 1.8 million visitors in March 2009, but by May of the same year, the number of visitors decreased to 600,000. On July 24, 2009, SearchMe went offline due to financial troubles, such as maintaining the servers.

Of its 45 employees, SearchMe announced in July 2009 it planned to dismiss 35. The company attempted to concentrate on the market of broadband TV.

Searches
As searches queries are being made, SearchMe returns categories that are related to the topic. The search engine has Facebook and Twitter links so that the results can be shared. The top of the screen displays the screenshot, while the bottom reveals the hyperlink and a site's description. Moving the mouse from left to right makes the screen "flip in the corresponding direction".

SearchMe's tagline is "You'll know it when you see it." As of March 2008, the website has indexed one billion pages.

Revenue
It requires about 3 million searches every day for the company to "break even". The website receives its revenue from advertisements. Advertisements are displayed through screenshots of the products or companies that are being promoted. Search results are ranked through algorithms and the number of views a website has received. Websites that are "visually appealing" are ranked higher than those that are not.

Criticism
SearchMe has been criticized for not providing the number of search results, causing users to not know whether they are perusing through 10 results or 1000 results. Some of SearchMe's screenshots are difficult to read, causing users to decide whether a site is relevant based on its appearance. However, the website highlights the search queries for easier perusal of the screenshot.

Other services
In 2007, SearchMe founded Wikiseek, which indexed Wikipedia pages and sites that were linked to from Wikipedia articles.

In October 2008, SearchMe released a music streaming service, which enables users to download an unlimited number of songs. The service relies on Imeem's collection of music.

References

Defunct American websites
Companies based in Mountain View, California
Companies established in 2005
Defunct internet search engines
Defunct online companies of the United States